Regulation 2018/1971 sets the maximum price caps for intra-EU international communications made from subscribers' home network countries. Regulation is in force since 15 May 2019.

Territorial extent 

Regulation applies to 30 EEA member countries (All 27 EU member countries as well as 3 EFTA member countries - Iceland, Liechtenstein and Norway).

Prices

Local price limits 
When maximum prices are denominated in other currencies other than the euro, the initial limits is calculated using the average of the reference exchange rates published in the Official Journal of the European Union (OJoEU) on 15 January, 15 February and 15 March 2019. From 2020, the limits in currencies other than the euro is revised annually. The revised limits shall apply from 15 May using the average of the reference exchange rates published in the OJoEU on 15 January, 15 February and 15 March of that year.

References 

International telecommunications
European Union regulations